David Battie FRSA (born 22 October 1942) is a British retired expert on ceramics, with a particular specialism in Japanese and Chinese artefacts.

Career
After attending art school, where he studied graphic design, Battie worked for Reader's Digest magazine for three years. In 1965 he joined the auction house Sotheby's. There he worked in the Departments of Ceramics and Oriental Works of Art and was appointed a Director in 1976. He retired from Sotheby's in 1999.

After leaving Sotheby's he became editor of Masterpiece magazine and has written many books on pottery and porcelain. He also undertakes public speaking.

He is probably best known for his many appearances on the long-running BBC television show Antiques Roadshow, in which he appeared for 43 years, from the first series in 1977 until his retirement in 2020.

Personal life
In 2012, after a simple fall, Battie broke his leg whilst travelling to Norwich to give a talk. He was in hospital for six months in Brighton and subsequently suffered an infection which was resistant to treatment by all antibiotics. He underwent upwards of eight operations. including four skin grafts, of which three failed. 

Battie suffers from the genetic disorder haemochromatosis and has also developed Type 2 diabetes. He is an ambassador for the charity Antibiotic Research UK.

Bibliography
 The Price Guide to 19th and 20th Century British Pottery (1975)
 Sotheby's Encyclopedia of Porcelain (editor, 1990)
 Sotheby's Encyclopedia of Glass (coeditor, 1991)
 Reader's Digest Treasures in Your Home (consultant editor, 1992)
 Understanding 19th Century British Porcelain (1994)

References

External links
 List of published works on Bookfinder.com
 

1942 births
Living people
Antiques experts
British non-fiction writers
British book editors
BBC television presenters
British male writers
Male non-fiction writers